The 1964 Tour de France started with 132 cyclists, divided into 12 teams of 11 cyclists:

The main favourite was defending champion Jacques Anquetil. He had won the 1964 Giro d'Italia earlier that year, and was trying to win a Tour-Giro double, which at that moment had only been done by Fausto Coppi.

Start list

By team

By rider

By nationality

References

1964 Tour de France
1964